Orion the Hunter is the only album from the band Orion the Hunter, which was an offshoot of the band Boston. Guitarist Barry Goudreau and backing vocalist Brad Delp were members of Boston, and guitarist/vocalist Fran Cosmo would join a later incarnation of the band. The group also included Michael DeRosier (from the group Heart) on drums and percussion, and Bruce Smith on bass.

The album was released in 1984 and charted at number 57. It featured the single "So You Ran", which was a rock radio top 10 hit; it also charted on the Billboard Hot 100.

Reception

Allmusic's Doug Stone retrospectively gave the album two stars. Saying of the songs "Fast Talk", "Dreamin'" and "I Call It Love": "[they are] good, professional rock tunes. Maybe too professional, as they come off a bit cold". He went on to say that "even though Orion the Hunter holds some personal nostalgia, too many albums deserve more attention".

Track listing
All Those Years (Brad Delp, Barry Goudreau, F. Migliaccio) 4:50
So You Ran (Goudreau, Migliaccio) 4:58
Dreamin' (Goudreau, Migliaccio) 5:26
Dark & Stormy (Goudreau, Migliaccio) 5:15
Stand Up (Goudreau, Migliaccio) 5:18
Fast Talk (Goudreau, Migliaccio) 4:15
Too Much in Love (Delp, Goudreau, Migliaccio, J. Piercy) 3:51
Joanne (Delp, Migliaccio, Bruce Smith) 4:27
I Call It Love (Delp, Goudreau, Migliaccio) 3:52

Personnel

Orion the Hunter
Fran Cosmo - lead vocals, acoustic and electric guitars, phased guitar (on "Stand Up")
Barry Goudreau - lead, rhythm, slide and 12-string guitars, backing vocals
Bruce Smith - bass, backing vocals
Michael DeRosier - drums, percussion

Additional personnel
Brad Delp - additional vocals
Lennie Petze - additional guitars ("Chuka Chuka") on "So You Ran"
Steve Baker - grand piano
Jimmy Bralower, John Schuller and Peter Wood - keyboards, synthesizers

Technical personnel
Production - Barry Goudreau and Lennie Petze
Recording and engineering - Josh Abbey, Larry Alexander and Gregg Lunsford
Assistant engineers - Ted Greenwald, Gary Lindquist
Mixing - Tony Bongiovi
Mastering - Steve Hoffman

Notes 

1984 debut albums
Portrait Records albums